Entering Heaven Alive is the fifth studio album by the American rock musician Jack White, released on July 22, 2022, through Third Man Records.

Promotion and release
In October 2021, White released "Taking Me Back", his first solo single since 2018. An acoustic version, "Taking Me Back (Gently)", was released as the B-side. In November 2021, White revealed that he would release two solo albums in 2022: Fear of the Dawn, which featured White's traditional rock sound, and Entering Heaven Alive, a folk album.

In December 2021, White announced the Supply Chain Issues Tour kicking off on April 8, 2022, in Detroit, Michigan. The tour covers North America and Europe. On January 14, 2022, White released lead single "Love Is Selfish" and an accompanying music video. On February 11, 2022, White released the "Love Is Selfish" single with the Fear of the Dawn title track as its B-side. On March 3, 2022, White released the song "Hi-De-Ho" (which features rapper Q-Tip, formerly of hip hop group A Tribe Called Quest) as the second standalone single from Fear of the Dawn. The single included the B-side "Queen of the Bees". Finally on June 8, 2022, White released the song "If I Die Tomorrow" with an accompanying video.

Entering Heaven Alive was released on July 22, 2022.

Recording
The album was recorded throughout 2021 at Third Man Studio in Nashville. Parts of "All Along the Way" were recorded at the George Nelson Kirkpatrick House in Kalamazoo, Michigan.

Track listing

Personnel
Primary artist
 Jack White – vocals (all tracks), acoustic guitar (1–4, 8–11), percussion (1, 2, 6, 7), drums (2, 7, 8, 10), electric guitar (tracks 2, 5, 8), bass guitar (tracks 2, 4, 7, 8), ukele bass (track 2), Hammond organ (track 2), vibraphone (track 3), Wurlitzer piano (track 3), additional perscussion (tracks 3, 5), Chamberlin drum machine (track 5), Mellotron M4000D (track 6), Hammond Solovox (track 6), piano (track 7), analog Mellotron (track 8), Septavox synthesizer (track 8)

Session musicians
 Ben Swank – drums (tracks 1, 9)
 Dominic Davis – bass guitar (tracks 1, 5, 9), upright bass (tracks 6, 11)
 Mark Watrous – piano (track 1), additional keys (track 3), Wurlitzer piano (track 9)
 Olivia Jean – Tic-Tac bass guitar (track 2), electric guitar (track 2), live percussion (track 3), shakers (track 11)
 Patrick Keeler – drums (3, 6, 11)
 Fats Kaplin – violin (tracks 3, 11), viola (track 3), strings (track 3)
 Dean Fertita – Wurlitzer piano solo (track 3)
 Cory Younts – live piano (track 3), piano (track 11)
 Quincy McCrary – piano (tracks 3, 5, 9, 10)
 Pokey LaFarge – acoustic guitar (tracks 3, 11)
 Daru Jones – drums (track 5)
 Dan Mancini – acoustic guitar (track 6)
 Jack Lawrence – bass guitar (track 10)

Technical personnel
 Jack White – production (all tracks), engineering (tracks 2, 5), mixing (all tracks)
 Joshua V. Smith – engineering (tracks 1–3, 5–7, 9–11), mixing (tracks 1–3, 5–7, 9–11)
 Bill Skibbe – engineering (tracks 1–5, 7–10), mixing (tracks 1–5, 8–11), mastering (all tracks)

Packaging
 The Third Man – packaging design
 Rob Jones at Animal Rummy – packaging design
 Sara Deck – photo restoration and touch-up
 Nikolai Matorin – front cover photograph (Rhythm of Labor, 1960)
 Ed Westcott – back cover and inner sleeve photographs (Civil Defense air raid drill, Highland View School, 1953)

Charts

References

2022 albums
Jack White albums
Third Man Records albums